This is a list of islands of Ireland. Ireland is itself an island, lying west of the island of Great Britain and northwest of mainland Europe.

The Hebrides off Scotland and Anglesey off Wales were grouped with Ireland ("Hibernia") by the Greco-Roman geographer Ptolemy, but this is no longer common.

Largest islands by area and population

Total population of Irish offshore Islands
The number of people living on Irish islands decreased dramatically during the Irish famine and the period following it. Since then the trend on most islands has been a decreasing population until the 1950s and 1960s during which many islands were forcefully evacuated by the Irish Government as continuous bad weather meant that islanders were unable to travel to the mainland for several consecutive months. Of the remaining islands that were not evacuated, many of their populations have continued to dwindle ever since, with some seeing stabilisation or even a slight uptick in population during and after the Celtic Tiger.

The chart below shows the total number of people living on Irish islands throughout the years.

Full table

Notes

References
  Vol. I: A–C, Vol. II: D–M, Vol. III: N–Z
  2nd, No.1145, 3rd, No.1146, 4th, No.1147, 5th, No.1148, 6th, No.1149 (PDFs: pp.1–7 pp.8–40), 7th, No.1155, 8th, No.1199, 9th, No.1191, 10th, No.1223, 11th, No.1257, 12th, No.1266, 13th, No.1277, 14th, No.1278

See also
List of islands of County Mayo

 
Ireland, List of islands of
Islands